Rothesay Bay is a small suburb in Auckland's East Coast Bays region. The suburb is roughly the same size as Murrays Bay, the suburb to the immediate south.

The name is taken from the small inlet into the Hauraki Gulf, which can be accessed via Rothesay Bay Road. There is a rectangular piece of parkland adjoining the beach, alongside which is the Rothesay Bay Creek. To the north is situated Browns Bay, while to the south is Murray's Bay.

Rothesay Bay beach is in a wind funnel and gets a sea breeze.

It is currently under the local governance of the Auckland Council.

Demographics

Rothesay Bay had a population of 2,886 at the 2018 New Zealand census, an increase of 180 people (6.7%) since the 2013 census, and an increase of 273 people (10.4%) since the 2006 census. There were 960 households, comprising 1,407 males and 1,482 females, giving a sex ratio of 0.95 males per female. The median age was 39.8 years (compared with 37.4 years nationally), with 558 people (19.3%) aged under 15 years, 561 (19.4%) aged 15 to 29, 1,368 (47.4%) aged 30 to 64, and 399 (13.8%) aged 65 or older.

Ethnicities were 79.4% European/Pākehā, 4.7% Māori, 1.8% Pacific peoples, 17.9% Asian, and 2.9% other ethnicities. People may identify with more than one ethnicity.

The percentage of people born overseas was 43.0, compared with 27.1% nationally.

Although some people chose not to answer the census's question about religious affiliation, 57.7% had no religion, 33.9% were Christian, 0.6% were Hindu, 0.5% were Muslim, 0.4% were Buddhist and 1.0% had other religions.

Of those at least 15 years old, 876 (37.6%) people had a bachelor's or higher degree, and 165 (7.1%) people had no formal qualifications. The median income was $43,200, compared with $31,800 nationally. 708 people (30.4%) earned over $70,000 compared to 17.2% nationally. The employment status of those at least 15 was that 1,191 (51.2%) people were employed full-time, 420 (18.0%) were part-time, and 66 (2.8%) were unemployed.

Notable residents
Chris Rankin who played Percy Weasley in the Harry Potter film series grew up in Rothesay Bay until he was 6 years old.

References

External links
 Walk ends in tragedy – Stuff.co.nz
 Photographs of Rothesay Bay held in Auckland Libraries' heritage collections.

Suburbs of Auckland
North Shore, New Zealand
Bays of the Auckland Region
East Coast Bays